Anolis luteosignifer, the Cayman Brac anole, is a species of lizard in the family Dactyloidae. The species is found on Cayman Brac in 
the Cayman Islands.

References

Anoles
Endemic fauna of the Cayman Islands
Reptiles described in 1888
Taxa named by Samuel Garman